Soil marks are differences in soil colour as a result of archaeological features. They can be seen when a ploughed-out earthwork has left hard dry material of a former bank and damper wetter material from a former ditch. They can also occur when a feature has cut through the top soil to reveal underlying chalk.

Soil marks are traces of archaeological features, which are visible in ploughed or harrowed fields, usually where there are restricted periods before the crops grow.

The most obvious and occurring trace of soil marks is the color difference to the rest of soil. Depending on the area in the aspect of geology the soil marks can show up as brown against white background or vice versa with even darker against lighter tones.  The color of the soil is very important in determining whether or not organic or burnt deposits happened over the soil that would produce a black or red color soil. This allows archaeologists to understand the concept of the artefacts found in the region of the soil mark and can see whether or not fire was used.

Archaeology that involves plough-damaged field systems, burial mounds, Roman villas or former sites usually produce soil marks. The soil marks gives the archaeologists an idea of where the structures were built or where the soil was damaged and for what reason. An example was given that this might be a dried-up river channel (known as a palaeochannel), which may subsequently reveal rich waterlogged archaeological deposits in its lower layers, or an area of slightly higher ground above winter flood level on an alluvial floodplain, which may be very hard to detect from the ground but which has attracted settlement for thousands of years.

See also
 Crop mark

Notes

Methods in archaeology